Thetis Receiving the Weapons of Achilles from Hephaestus is a 1630–1632 painting by the Flemish painter Anthony van Dyck. It was acquired by Archduke Leopold Wilhelm of Austria and is now in the Kunsthistorisches Museum in Vienna. It illustrates the story of the Shield of Achilles, from the Iliad, Book 18, lines 478–608, in which Thetis requests replacement weapons and shield for her son Achilles from Hephaestus.

External links
http://bilddatenbank.khm.at/viewArtefact?id=650

Mythological paintings by Anthony van Dyck
1632 paintings
Paintings in the collection of the Kunsthistorisches Museum
Paintings depicting Greek myths
Angels in art
Cultural depictions of Achilles
Paintings based on the Iliad
Hephaestus